Jan Żurawski (1 January 1932 – 2 March 2023) was a Polish wrestler. He competed in the men's freestyle featherweight at the 1960 Summer Olympics.

References

External links
 

1932 births
2023 deaths
Polish male sport wrestlers
Olympic wrestlers of Poland
Wrestlers at the 1960 Summer Olympics
Sportspeople from Warsaw
People from Warsaw Voivodeship (1919–1939)